Sir Arthur Lucius Michael Cary GCB (3 April 1917 - 6 March 1976) was a British civil servant who served as Permanent Under-Secretary of State for Defence.

Early life and education 
Cary was born to Joyce Cary and Gertrude Margaret Ogilvie at Harrow, Middlesex.

Cary was educated at Eton and Trinity College, Oxford.

Career 
Cary joined HM Diplomatic Service in 1939. He served as Deputy Secretary of the Cabinet from 1961 to 1964, Secretary of the Admiralty in 1964, and Deputy Secretary at the Ministry of Defence from 1964 to 1968. Cary was Permanent Under-Secretary of State at the Ministry of Defence from 1974 to 1976.

Honours 
Cary was appointed a Companion of the Order of the Bath (CB) in the 1964 New Year Honours, advanced to Knight Commander of the Order of the Bath (KCB) in the 1965 Birthday Honours, and further advanced to Knight Grand Cross of the Order of the Bath (GCB) in the 1976 New Year Honours.

References

1917 births
1976 deaths
People educated at Eton College
Alumni of Trinity College, Oxford
British civil servants
Ministry of Defence (United Kingdom)
Permanent Under-Secretaries of State for Defence
Lords of the Admiralty
Knights Grand Cross of the Order of the Bath